The Myanmar–Thailand border is the international border between the territory of Myanmar (formerly Burma) and Thailand. The border is 2,416 km (1,501 m) in length and runs from the tripoint with Laos in the north to Andaman Sea coast in the south.

Description
The border starts in the north at the tripoint with Laos at the confluence of the Kok and Mekong Rivers and, after briefly following the Kok and then the Sai, then proceeds overland to the west via a series of irregular lines through the Daen Lao Range, before turning to the south-west and joining the Salween River. The border follows the Salween and then Moei River southwards, before leaving it and proceeding southwards overland through the Dawna Range and Bilauktaung Range (collectively these mountains form the Tenasserim Hills). The border continues southwards down the Malay Peninsula, almost cutting Thailand in two at Prachuap Khiri Khan, before reaching the Isthmus of Kra and the Kraburi River, which it then follows out via a wide estuary to the Andaman Sea. The maritime boundary then follows coordinates marked by the countries' continental shelf delimitation agreement towards the tripoint with India, which controls the Andaman and Nicobar Islands.

History

The border regions have historically been contested between the various Thai and Burmese states. Fighting between Burma and the Siamese Ayutthaya Kingdom over control of what is now Myanmar's Tanintharyi Region dominated the area in the 16th century, before Burma destroyed Ayutthaya and took control of the region in 1767. Soon after, Siam extended suzerainty over the Lanna Kingdom (now Northern Thailand), which had previously been under Burmese control. Burmese expansion in the 19th century brought it into conflict with the British in India, sparking a series of conflicts which ended with Burma being occupied and incorporated into British India. With France occupying French Indochina in the same period, the two European states allowed the Kingdom of Siam (the old name for Thailand) to retains its independence as a buffer state.

In 1868 Britain and Siam signed a treaty delimiting the Burma-Thai border from the Salween south to the Andaman Sea. Following some confusion as to the border's location, on the ground demarcation of the border commenced from 1889 to 1892. In 1892 the northern section of the border delimited and then demarcated on the ground from 1893 to 1894, with a final boundary treaty with maps signed on 17 October 1894. The northern terminus of the border was fixed in 1896 when the British and French agreed that the Mekong would serve as the Burma-Laos border. Some minor boundary adjustments occurred in 1929 and 1934. In 1941, following Japan's invasion of Burma, parts of Burma were ceded to Siam as the Saharat Thai Doem territory, however these areas were returned to Burma in 1946 following Japan's defeat and since then the border has remained in place. In 1937 Burma was separated from India and became a separate colony, gaining full independence in 1948, at which point the border became an international frontier between two sovereign states.

At present there is an outstanding dispute over the ownership of some small islands in the Andaman Sea.

From 2010 to 2012 there were clashes along the border between the Myanmar army and the Karen National Liberation Army.

In 2021, the Myanmar military clashed with civilians in the border areas. Many of them fled and ended up in Thailand.

Border crossings
As of 2019, there were 6 permanent border crossings, 1 temporary border crossing, 13 checkpoints for border trade and 1 special checkpoint for border trade.

Permanent Border Crossing

Temporary Border Crossing 
Border crossing open for foreigners for travel purposes only.

Checkpoint for Border Trade 
Border crossing open for cross-border local trade only. There are 13 checkpoints for border trade officially recognized by the Ministry of Interior, located in Chiang Rai, Chiang Mai, Mae Hong Son and Ranong provinces. Entering the opposite country beyond these checkpoints and their associated markets is illegal.

Special Checkpoint for Border Trade 
Border crossing open for cross-border local trade only. Special Checkpoints for Border Trade are planned as future permanent crossing. Entering the opposite country beyond these checkpoints and their associated markets is currently illegal.

Gallery

See also
 Myanmar–Thailand relations

References

 
border
Borders of Thailand
Borders of Myanmar
International borders